Dashmir Elezi (born 21 November 2004) is a Macedonian professional footballer who plays as a forward for Georgian side Torpedo Kutaisi.

Club career
Born in Tetovo, North Macedonia, Elezi joined Shkëndija at youth level. He was promoted to the first team squad in November 2020, and became the youngest goal-scorer in the top flight of Macedonian football when he scored on his debut in a 1–1 draw against Shkupi, a day after his sixteenth birthday.

He signed his first professional contract in June 2021. In October of the same year, he was named by English newspaper The Guardian as one of the best players born in 2004 worldwide.

In January 2022, a proposed transfer to Turkish side Gaziantep fell through. However, a year later, in January 2023, Elezi moved to Georgia to join Erovnuli Liga side Torpedo Kutaisi, signing a three-year contract.

International career
Elezi has represented North Macedonia at youth international level.

Personal life
Elezi's father, Skender, died in a car accident near Plovdiv, Bulgaria in December 2022.

Career statistics
.

Honours
FK Shkëndija
Macedonian First League: 2020–21

References

2004 births
Living people
Sportspeople from Tetovo
Macedonian footballers
North Macedonia youth international footballers
Association football forwards
Macedonian First Football League players
KF Shkëndija players
FC Torpedo Kutaisi players
Macedonian expatriate footballers
Macedonian expatriate sportspeople in Georgia (country)
Expatriate footballers in Georgia (country)